= Justin McDaniel =

American religious studies professor

Justin McDaniel is an American religious studies professor at the University of Pennsylvania, where he holds the Edmund J. and Louise W. Kahn Endowed Professor of the Humanities chair. He is known for teaching the Existential Despair course, in which he asks students to adopt elements of a monastic lifestyle. The course has been described as having a cult following.
